Émile Ess (9 January 1932 – 30 November 1990) was a Swiss rower who competed in the 1952 Summer Olympics and in the 1960 Summer Olympics.

He was born in Ruswil. In 1952, he was a crew member of the Swiss boat which won the silver medal in the coxed four event.

Eight years later, he was part of the Swiss boat which was eliminated in the repechage of the eight competition.

References

External links 
 
 

1932 births
1990 deaths
Swiss male rowers
Olympic rowers of Switzerland
Rowers at the 1952 Summer Olympics
Rowers at the 1960 Summer Olympics
Olympic silver medalists for Switzerland
Olympic medalists in rowing
Medalists at the 1952 Summer Olympics
European Rowing Championships medalists
Sportspeople from the canton of Lucerne